is a Japanese politician who serves as the President of the House of Councillors since August 2022. A member of the Liberal Democratic Party, he has been a member of the House of Councillors since 1989, serving as Vice President of the House of Councillors from 2010 to 2012 and as Minister of Health, Labour, and Welfare from 2004 to 2005.

Early life and education 
He was born in Kaseda City in Kagoshima Prefecture on the island of Kyūshū.  During the Pacific War, his father, Shuichi, was a lieutenant commander in the Imperial Japanese Navy and captain of the destroyer Yūgiri. In 1943, he went down with the ship in the Battle of Cape St. George.

Otsuji briefly attended the National Defense Academy but dropped out in 1961 to support his sister after their mother died. He later attended the prestigious University of Tokyo, but again dropped out.

From his own account, Otsuji was unhappy with university education.  Reflecting on his youth as en elderly politician, he noted the social unrest at the time and protests against the government of Prime Minister  Kishi, and said that lectures were rarely held and there was no worthwhile education to be had.  Instead, he took the time to travel the world and visited close to 80 countries over a period of five years.  In 1971 he returned to Japan and officially withdrew from Tokyo University and returned to Kagoshima.

Political career 

Resolving to become a politician, Otsuji was elected to the Kagoshima Prefectural Assembly in 1979.  He was defeated in his run for the House of Representatives in 1986 but was elected to the House of Councillors in 1989.

He served as Parliamentary Vice Minister in the Management and Coordination Agency in 1992, Parliamentary Vice Minister in the Okinawa Development Agency in 1994 and Senior Vice Minister of Finance in 2001. In 2004 he was appointed Minister of Health, Labour and Welfare in the cabinet of Prime Minister Junichirō Koizumi, serving as such until 2005.

Otsuji was elected Vice President of the House of Councillors following the 2010 House of Councillors election. In December 2012 he resigned to become President of the Japan War-Bereaved Families Association and served as such until 2014.

In August 2022, Otsuji was elected President of the House of Councillors.

Otsuji is affiliated to the conservative organization Nippon Kaigi.

Otsuji is also the author of several books, including "Africa Travel Diary" and "Going to Bokemon World."  "Bokemon" is a word from the Kagoshima dialect of Japanese meaning "recklessly strong".

References

External links 
  in Japanese.
 http://www.kantei.go.jp/foreign/koizumidaijin/040927/07otsuji_e.html
 https://web.archive.org/web/20051031043150/http://otsuji.gr.jp/bokke.htm (Japanese)

|-

1940 births
Living people
Politicians from Kagoshima Prefecture
University of Tokyo alumni
Members of Nippon Kaigi
Members of the House of Councillors (Japan)
Ministers of Health, Labour and Welfare of Japan
Presidents of the House of Councillors (Japan)